The Economic Growth, Regulatory Relief, and Consumer Protection Act (abbreviated EGRRCPA;) was signed into law by President Donald Trump on May 24, 2018. The bill eased financial regulations imposed by Dodd–Frank Wall Street Reform and Consumer Protection Act after the financial crisis of 2007–2008. 

Specifically, the bill raised the threshold from $50 billion to $250 billion under which banks are deemed too big to fail. The bill also eliminated the Volcker Rule for small banks with less than $10 billion in assets.

The Act was the most significant change to U.S. banking regulations since Dodd–Frank. Barney Frank said parts of the original Dodd Frank act were a mistake and supported the legislation.

Legislative history
In the House, the bill passed by a 258-159 vote with support from all but one Republican (the exception being Walter B. Jones Jr.) and 33 out of 193 Democrats. In the Senate, the bill passed by a 67-31 vote with support from all Republicans and 17 out of 47 Democrats. Within the Democratic caucuses, progressives strongly opposed the bill.

Aftermath 
Some banking experts said that Silicon Valley Bank and Signature Bank would have managed its risks better had Dodd-Frank “not been rolled back under President Trump,” however other experts have disputed this assertion as Silicon Valley Bank was still required to undergo periodic stress testing under the Act. 

SVB’s CEO Greg Becker supported the rollback and explicitly lobbied for its passage, due to the reduced frequency and number of scenarios required for stress testing implemented under the Dodd–Frank Wall Street Reform and Consumer Protection Act for banks with under $250 billion in assets. The Federal Reserve Bank of San Francisco did have discretion to annually examine any bank with $100 billion in assets.

References

External links
 Economic Growth, Regulatory Relief, and Consumer Protection Act as amended (PDF/details) in the GPO Statute Compilations collection

2018 in economics
Acts of the 115th United States Congress
Consumer protection legislation
Presidency of Donald Trump
Systemic risk
United States federal banking legislation